TRK or trk may refer to:

 Juwata International Airport (IATA code: TRK), an international airport in Tarakan, North Kalimantan, Indonesia
 Potassium transport proteins (Trk), a constituent of the protein family bacterial potassium transporter
 Trk receptor, a family of tyrosine kinases that regulates synaptic strength and plasticity in the mammalian nervous system
 Truckee Tahoe Airport (FAA LID code: TRK), a public airport two miles east of Truckee, California, United States
 Turkic languages (ISO 639-5 code: trk), a language family of at least 35 documented languages